26 Years is the ninth studio album by punk rock band The Lurkers. The CD release of the album by the Street Dogs Record label also has an additional eight tracks, a single release of "Go Ahead Harry" from 1999 with the accompanying B-side and 6 tracks recorded live from their performance in Newcastle in 2003. The album contains a few re-recordings of old Lurkers tracks including their notable single "Mass Media Believer". The album spawned what could be somewhat of a modern classic for The Lurkers in the shape of "Go Ahead Punk". The album art was created by Richard Stone.

Track listing

Personnel
Arturo Bassick (Arthur Billingsley) - bass, vocals
Billy Gilbert - guitar
Nelly Drums (Robert Hunter) - drums

References

2003 albums
The Lurkers albums
Captain Oi! Records albums